Yeni Zod is a village and municipality in the Goygol District of Azerbaijan. The village had an Armenian population before the exodus of Armenians from Azerbaijan after the outbreak of the Nagorno-Karabakh conflict.

In 1989, the village became home to ethnic Azeri refugees from Sotk (Zod) in Armenia. The village became the new municipal seat known as Yeni Zod ("New Zod").

Toponymy 
The village was known as Azad until 1999.

History 
The village was a part of the Getashen subdistrict which participated in the Artsakh declaration of independence.

Demographics 
The village has a population of 1,216.

References 

Populated places in Goygol District
Former Armenian inhabited settlements